1,2,6-Trigalloyl glucose is a gallotannin found in cell cultures of Cornus officinalis.

References 

Gallotannins
Trihydroxybenzoic acids
Pyrogallols